Paschal Robinson, O.F.M., (born David Robinson; 26 April 1870 – 27 August 1948) was an Irish ecclesiastical diplomat. A journalist and renowned medievalist before he entered diplomatic service, he was the titular archbishop of Tyana and the first apostolic nuncio to Ireland since the 17th-century Archbishop Rinuccini. Influential in his position, he served as nuncio from January 1930 until his death in 1948.

Career

Born David Robinson in Ireland on 26 April 1870 and raised in the United States, Robinson was the son of a journalist and began his career as a teenager in that same field.

Robinson studied at the Jesuit College of the Holy Cross (1895) and the Franciscan St. Bonaventure University (1896), becoming a Franciscan in August 1896, and being sent by the Franciscans to study in Rome under his new name, Paschal. He became a priest at St. Anthony's International College in Rome on 21 December 1901. In 1902, he received the Degree of Doctor of Sacred Theology and began to teach. He worked in and studied at various universities around the world and undertook a research project in Jerusalem. He also published; his first book was The Real St. Francis, released in 1903. There followed in the next seven years: Some Pages of Franciscan History (1905), The Writings of St. Francis (1906) and The Life of St. Clare (1910). He was associate editor of the Archivum Franciscanum Historicum and contributed to the Catholic Encyclopedia. By 1914, the year he was inducted into the Royal Historical Society, he was known as "one of the foremost living historians of the Middle Ages", a specialty he cultivated while at Oxford University.

In 1913, he was appointed Professor of Medieval History at The Catholic University of America in Washington D.C., a position he held from 1913 to 1919, when the Holy See took him into a diplomatic service in Rome. He served as apostolic visitor for the Holy See several times, first in 1920 to the Custodian of the Holy Land in Jerusalem, and again in 1925 to the Latin Patriarchate in Jerusalem and the Eastern Catholic Churches in Palestine, Transjordan, and Cyprus. He served as the titular archbishop of Tyana from May 1927 before, in December 1929, the pope appointed him the first apostolic nuncio to Ireland since the 17th-century Archbishop Giovanni Battista Rinuccini.

In 1930, he began his service as nuncio, arriving in January to a three-day celebration. In 1934, a photographer captured the German Envoy to Ireland, Georg von Dehn, kissing Robinson's episcopal ring. Von Dehn was immediately recalled and removed from diplomatic service by Adolf Hitler for unbecoming conduct, and the photograph – and word of its repercussions – spread internationally.

Robinson exerted tremendous influence in Ireland during his term and is credited in The Irish Times as having helped secure good relations between Ireland the Holy See. He remained in office until his death on 27 August 1948, at the Apostolic Nunciature in Dublin. In keeping with his wishes, he was buried in the section reserved for the Friars Minor in Glasnevin Cemetery.

Works

The Writings of St. Francis of Assisi; 1905.

References

External links
 
 

1870 births
Catholic University of America faculty
Apostolic Nuncios to Ireland
1948 deaths
Roman Catholic titular archbishops
Irish emigrants to the United States (before 1923)
American Friars Minor
The New York Sun people
College of the Holy Cross alumni
St. Bonaventure University alumni
Burials at Glasnevin Cemetery
Contributors to the Catholic Encyclopedia